The Fichtelberg Cable Car is a German cable car in the Ore Mountains in Saxony that runs from the town of Oberwiesenthal to the Fichtelberg mountain top. It is the oldest cable car in Germany, leading from the valley station at an altitude of 905 metres above sea level to the top station at 1,208 metres above sea level, having a length of 1,175 metres and a maximum upward gradient of 50 per cent. The Fichtelberg Cable Car is equipped with two carrying and two hauling cables.

Operations began in December 1924. The Fichtelberg Cable Car temporarily ceased operation in 1948 due to lack of maintenance during World War II. After a major overhaul, it reopened in 1956. Another major renovation took place in 1984, when one of the support towers were removed and the others where relocated.

References

Sources 
 Mario Schatz: Seilbahnen der DDR. transpress VEB Verlag für Verkehrswesen, Berlin 1987, .

External links 
 Official website (German)
 Europe for Visitors

Cable cars in Germany
Transport in the Ore Mountains
Oberwiesenthal
1924 establishments in Germany